The Roman Catholic Diocese of Amarillo is a Roman Catholic diocese in Amarillo, Texas. It was founded on August 3, 1926 out of territory taken from the Diocese of Dallas and the Diocese of San Antonio on the same day that the Roman Catholic Archdiocese of San Antonio, its metropolitan see, was elevated to metropolitan status, replacing New Orleans. The Diocese consists of the following 26 counties in the Texas panhandle: Armstrong, Briscoe, Carson, Castro, Childress, Collingsworth, Dallam, Deaf Smith, Donley, Gray, Hall, Hansford, Hartley, Hemphill, Hutchinson, Lipscomb, Moore, Ochiltree, Oldham, Parmer, Potter, Randall, Roberts, Sherman, Swisher, and Wheeler.

Bishops

Bishops of Amarillo
The list of bishops and their terms of service:
 Rudolph Gerken (1926–1933), appointed Archbishop of Santa Fe
 Robert Emmet Lucey (1934–1941), appointed Archbishop of San Antonio
 Laurence Julius FitzSimon (1941–1958)
 John Louis Morkovsky (1958–1963), appointed Bishop of Galveston-Houston
 Lawrence Michael De Falco (1963–1979)
 Leroy Theodore Matthiesen (1980–1997)
 John Walter Yanta (1997–2008)
 Patrick Zurek (2008–present)

Other priest of the diocese who became a bishop
 Thomas Joseph Drury, appointed Bishop of San Angelo in 1961 and later Bishop of Corpus Christi

Education
 High Schools
 Holy Cross Catholic Academy, Amarillo

Former Cathedrals
Sacred Heart Cathedral (Amarillo, Texas), 1927-1975
St. Laurence Catholic Church (Amarillo, Texas), 1975-2011

See also

 Catholic Church by country
 Catholic Church in the United States
 Ecclesiastical Province of San Antonio
 Global organisation of the Catholic Church
 List of Roman Catholic archdioceses (by country and continent)
 List of Roman Catholic dioceses (alphabetical) (including archdioceses)
 List of Roman Catholic dioceses (structured view) (including archdioceses)
 List of the Catholic dioceses of the United States

References

External links
Roman Catholic Diocese of Amarillo Official Site

 
Christian organizations established in 1926
Culture of Amarillo, Texas
Amarillo
Amarillo
1926 establishments in Texas